WMGG (1470 AM) is a commercial AM radio station licensed to Egypt Lake, Florida, whose main AM signal is exclusively digital via HD Radio. WMGG serves the Tampa Bay area and is owned by Daniel de la Rosa, through licensee DRC Broadcasting, Inc. WMGG airs a Spanish-language tropical radio format. The station uses the moniker "Ritmo 101.9".

WMGG's transmitter is off Cavacade Drive in Egypt Lake. It is powered at 2,800 watts by day. But at night, to protect other stations on AM 1470, WMGG reduces power to 800 watts. It uses a directional antenna at all times.

History 
In 1954, the station first signed on as WDCL. Its city of license was Tarpon Springs, Florida, and it was a 5,000 watt daytimer, required to go off the air at sunset. WDCL was owned by the Freede-Miller Broadcasting Company, with Hal Freede serving as president and sales manager. J. McCarthy Miller was the general manager.

In the late 1960s and parts of the 1970s, the station played a mix of Top 40 and oldies with the call sign WCWR.

In the mid-1970s, the station became a news/talk station, with being the first station to have a Home Shopping radio program, which later spread all over the United States on television.

On May 17, 1984, the station became an affiliate of Dan Ingram's Top 40 Satellite Survey.

Prior to June 5, 2009, WMGG was an adult standards music station branded as "Mega 1470."

Prior to December 29, 2008, WMGG was an all-sports station as an ESPN Radio Network affiliate.

As a result of Genesis Communications' announced purchase of AM 1470, where the news/talk format of WWBA now airs at 820 AM, WHBO's sports format moved to WWBA's former frequency, 1040 AM, in October 2008, and simulcast on 1470 in the short-term. The WHBO call sign moved to 1040, with 1470 receiving new call letters, WMGG.

In 2011, WMGG switched to a talk radio format, picking up programs formerly on sister station 1040 WWBA (now WHBO).

Effective May 4, 2018, WMGG was sold to Nia Broadcasting, Inc. It switched to a simulcast of the Regional Mexican music format heard on co-owned 96.1 WTMP-FM in Dade City, Florida.

WMGG also switched its transmitter facilities to Egypt Lake, a suburb of Tampa, and no longer identifies Dunedin, Florida as its city of license. WMGG is diplexed with co-owned AM 1150 WTMP.

Full-time HD Radio transmission
In October 2020, WMGG announced the station will be changing their AM signal to a full digital AM signal in HD Radio using the MA3 mode.

On January 12, 2021, WMGG switched off their analog AM signal and is currently transmitting as a digital only HD Radio station using the MA3 mode. Because of this WMGG is the first radio station in the U.S. to use digital only mode after the FCC approved the voluntary use of all digital radio on AM; it becomes the second station to go all-digital in practice, as WWFD has operated under experimental authorization as an all-digital station since July 2018.

On August 31, 2021, WMGG flipped to Spanish tropical, branded as "Ritmo 101.9"., La Nueva de Tampa.

Effective November 9, 2021, Nia Broadcasting sold WMGG and translator W270DU to DRC Broadcasting, Inc. for $600,000.

Previous logo

References

External links
Genesis Communications, Inc.

MGG
Tropical music radio stations
MGG